This is the list of independent radio stations.  Included are any non-profit  terrestrial broadcast community radio stations not directly affiliated, owned, or otherwise controlled by any radio network, school, company, or government.  All independent radio listed stations are independently operated (not necessarily the radio format indie music), and are considered to be community radio. A counterpart to this list is the list of college radio stations (some of the college radio stations are also community radio stations).

Canada
CKON FM 97.3 – Akwesasne, Ontario/Québec
CKRL FM 89.1 – Québec City, Québec
CJAI-FM Island Radio 101.3 FM – Stella, Ontario
CFML Evolution 107.9 FM – Vancouver, British Columbia
CITR CiTR 101.9 FM – Vancouver, British Columbia
CFRO Co-op Radio 100.5 FM – Vancouver, British Columbia
CJSF CJSF 90.1 FM – Burnaby, British Columbia
CIVL CIVL 101.7 FM – Abbotsford, British Columbia
CHLY CHLY 101.7 FM – Nanaimo, British Columbia
CHLY CFUV 101.9 FM – Victoria, British Columbia
CKXS The New 99.1 FM – Wallaceburg, Ontario
CKWR FM 98.5 – Kitchener, Ontario

United States
WORT 89.9 FM Listener Sponsored Community Radio Madison, Wisconsin
KXCI 91.3FM Tucson's Community Radio Tucson, Arizona
KWSS 93.9FM The Alternative Phoenix, Arizona
KUHS 97.9 FM Hot Springs, Arkansas
KABF FM 88.3 Little Rock, Arkansas
KNOC Radio 1680 AM Brea, California
KDVS 90.3 FM Davis, California
KPIG 107.5 FM Freedom, California
KFJC FM 89.7 Los Altos Hills, California
KTOX 1340 AM Needles, California
KVMR FM 89.5 Nevada City, California
KCSN 88.5 FM Northridge, California
KHTS 1220 AM in Santa Clarita, California
KCRW 89.9 FM Santa Monica, California
KZSU FM 90.1 Stanford. California
KGNU-FM FM 88.5 Denver/Boulder/Longmont, Colorado
WPKN FM 89.5 Real People Real Radio Bridgeport, Connecticut
WDUP-LP 92.9 FM Home of Timeless Hip Hop and R&B New London, Connecticut
WJKS 101.7 FM Wilmington, Delaware
WSLR 96.5 FM Radio Sarasota, Florida
WMNF FM 88.5 Tampa, Florida
WRFG-FM FM 89.3 Atlanta, Georgia ("Radio Free Georgia")
WDBX FM 91.9 Carbondale, Illinois
WEFT FM 90.1 Champaign, Illinois
WLUW FM 88.7 Chicago, Illinois
KJHK FM 90.7 The sound alternative Lawrence, Kansas
WFPK FM 91.9 Louisville, Kentucky
WNKR FM 106.7 Williamstown/Dry Ridge, Kentucky
KLSU 91.1 FM Baton Rouge, Louisiana
WWOZ FM 90.7 New Orleans, Louisiana
WXEX-FM 92.1 FM Sanford, Maine
WOCM FM 98.1 Ocean City, Maryland
WTMD FM 89.7 Towson, Maryland
WXRV FM 92.5 Andover, Massachusetts
WERS 88.9 FM Boston, Massachusetts
WRBB 104.9 FM Boston, Massachusetts
WOMR FM 92.3 Outermost Radio Provincetown, Massachusetts
WMEX 1510 AM Quincy, Massachusetts
WSAR 1480 AM Somerset, Massachusetts
WHTB 1400 AM Somerset, Massachusetts
WMVY 88.7 FM Tisbury, Massachusetts
WYCE FM 88.1 Grand Rapids, Michigan
WXTF 97.9 FM Harrisville, Michigan
KCMP FM 89.3 Minneapolis, Minnesota
KDHX 88.1 FM St. Louis, Missouri
KGLT FM 91.9 Bozeman, Montana
WMWV 93.5 FM Conway, New Hampshire
WFMU FM 91.1 Jersey City, New Jersey
WPRB 103.3 FM Princeton, New Jersey
WXPK FM 107.1, Briarcliff Manor, New York
WBNY 91.3 FM Buffalo, New York
WITR 89.7 FM Henrietta, New York
WRFI-FM FM 88.1, Ithaca, New York
WVBR-FM FM 93.5, Ithaca, New York
WFUV 90.7 FM New York, New York
WBER 90.5 FM Penfield, New York
WKZE 98.1 FM WKZE Red Hook, New York
WDKX 103.9 Rochester, New York
WDST Radio Woodstock, FM 100.1 WDST Woodstock, New York
WXYC 89.3 FM Chapel Hill, North Carolina
WXDU 88.7 FM Durham, North Carolina
WHUP-FM 104.7 FM Hillsborough, North Carolina
WKNC 88.1 FM Raleigh, North Carolina
WSGE-FM FM 91.7 Dallas/Gastonia/Charlotte, North Carolina
WXRC FM 95.7 Hickory/Charlotte/Gastonia, North Carolina
WWCD FM 92.9 Baltimore/Columbus, Ohio
KKRP Cowlington, Oklahoma
KBOO FM 90.7, Portland, Oregon
KXRY FM 91.1, Portland, Oregon
WDIY FM 88.1 Allentown, Pennsylvania
WXPN 88.5 FM Philadelphia, Pennsylvania
WKDU 91.7 FM Philadelphia, Pennsylvania
WSRU 88.1 FM Slippery Rock, Pennsylvania
WYEP FM 91.3 Pittsburgh, Pennsylvania
WXRY FM 99.3 Columbia, South Carolina
KEOS FM 89.1 Bryan/College Station, Texas
KKXT 91.7 FM Dallas-Fort Worth, Texas
KEDA 1540 AM San Antonio, Texas
KBEC AM 1390, Waxahachie, Texas
DJCR - FCC Part 15 LPAM AM 1670 Valencia, El Dorado, Northern Hills, Texas
KRCL FM 90.9 Salt Lake City, Utah
WERA-LP FM 96.7 Arlington, Virginia
WRIR-LP FM 97.3, Richmond, Virginia
WEQX FM 102.7 Manchester, Vermont
KNKX FM 88.5 Tacoma, Washington
KEXP FM 90.3 Seattle, Washington
KSER FM 90.7 Everett, Washington
KXIR FM 89.9 Freeland, Washington
KYRS FM 89.9, 92.3 Spokane, Washington
KHOL FM 89.1 Jackson, Wyoming
KPOO FM 89.5 San Francisco, California
WFHB FM 91.3 Bloomington, Indiana
WRCO FM 100.9 Richland Center, Wisconsin 
WRCO AM 1450 Richland Center, Wisconsin

United States internet broadcasts
AMMedia on air now 24/7 Indy music, We Are The Voice Of The Independent  Providence, RI
AMMedia Joy Comes Gospel 24/7, We Know Creativity Is Vital  San Francisco, CA
WUFO
Nashville Radio Nashville, Tennessee
Dewberry Jam Community Radio San Antonio, Texas
KNOCradio.com The Voice of North Orange County & The World A Community Radio Network, Inc. Station Brea, CA
KSGVradio.com The Voice of the Valley Glendora, CA
KKRP AM 1610 Your Home of Classic Rock and America's Progressive Voice Cowlington, OK
KHXI FM 99.9 Pure Country and Your Progressive Voice Cowlington, OK
JSLSRadio The Golden Age of Radio Cowlington, OK
Radio Rebel Independent Music Denver, CO www.RadioRebel.net
Mutiny Radio San Francisco, CA
Free 99 Tyler, TX
Rela Radio Wood River, Illinois

New Zealand
andHow.FM FM 107.5, Mangaroa
The Cheese FM 87.9, Lower Hutt

References

Indie
Alternative radio